The Hokey Pokey (worldwide) or Hockey Cokey (UK) is a dance and song.

Hokey pokey or hokey cokey may also refer to:

Dance and music
Hokey Pokey (album), an album by Richard and Linda Thompson released in 1975
Do The Hokey Pokey (dance), written by Larry LaPrise, Charles Macak and Taftt Baker.
Hokey Pokey Records, a record label

Food
Hokey pokey (ice cream), an iconic New Zealand flavour of ice cream
 Ice cream sold by street vendors, a precursor to ice cream sandwiches.
 Hokey pokey, a New Zealand term for Honeycomb toffee

See also
Hokey (disambiguation)